Janet Ellis is an American politician and a Democratic member of the Montana Senate. She served in the Montana House of Representatives from 2015 to 2019.

References

Living people
Democratic Party members of the Montana House of Representatives
21st-century American politicians
1956 births
People from Helena, Montana